Donna Lee Wennerstrom (born March 30, 1960), also known by her married name Donna Lee Carlson, is an American former competition swimmer and Pan American Games champion.  Wennerstrom represented the United States at the 1976 Summer Olympics in Montreal, Quebec.  She finished sixth in the final of the women's 400-meter individual medley with a time of 4:55.34.  She also competed in the preliminary heats of the women's 200-meter butterfly, recording a best time of 2:15.56.

See also
 List of University of California, Los Angeles people

References

1960 births
Living people
American female backstroke swimmers
American female butterfly swimmers
American female medley swimmers
Olympic swimmers of the United States
Swimmers from Santa Monica, California
Swimmers at the 1976 Summer Olympics
UCLA Bruins women's swimmers
Pan American Games gold medalists for the United States
Pan American Games medalists in swimming
Swimmers at the 1975 Pan American Games
Medalists at the 1975 Pan American Games
20th-century American women